A barcode system is a network of hardware and software, consisting primarily of mobile computers, printers,  handheld scanners, infrastructure, and supporting software. Barcode systems are used to automate data collection where hand recording is neither timely nor cost effective. Despite often being provided by the same company, Barcoding systems are not radio-frequency identification (RFID) systems. Many companies use both technologies as part of larger resource management systems.

History

In 1948, Bernard Silver was a graduate student at Drexel Institute of Technology in Philadelphia. A local food chain store owner had made an inquiry to the Drexel Institute asking about research into a method of automatically reading product information during checkout. Silver joined together with fellow graduate student Norman Joseph Woodland to work on a solution. Woodland's first idea was to use ultraviolet light sensitive ink. The team built a working prototype but decided that the system was too unstable and expensive. They went back to the drawing board.
On October 20, 1949, Woodland and Silver filed their patent application for the "Classifying Apparatus and Method", describing their invention as "article classification… through the medium of identifying patterns".

The first commercially successful barcode reading system was patented in November 1969 by John F. Keidel for the General Atronics Corp.

It was soon realized that there would have to be some sort of industry standard set. In 1970, the Universal Grocery Products Identification Code or UGPIC was written by a company called Logicon Inc. The first company to produce bar code equipment for retail trade use (using UGPIC) was the American company Monarch Marking in 1970, and for industrial use, the British company Plessey Telecommunications was also first in 1970. UGPIC evolved into the U.P.C. symbol set  or Universal Product Code, which is still used in the United States. George J. Laurer is considered the inventor of U.P.C. or Uniform Product Code, which was invented in 1973.
In June 1974, the first U.P.C. scanner was installed at a Marsh's supermarket in Troy, Ohio. The first product to have a barcode included was a packet of Wrigley's Gum.

Hardware

There is a wide range of hardware that is manufactured today for use in Barcode Systems. The best known brand of handheld scanners and mobile computers is Symbol, which is now a division of Motorola. Other manufacturers include Datalogic, Intermec, HHP (Hand Held Products), Microscan Systems, Unitech, Metrologic, PSC and PANMOBIL.

Software

While there is a range of hardware on the market, software is more difficult to find from the hardware manufacturers. Some ERP, MRP, and other inventory management software have built in support for barcode reading   and some even allow the software to run directly on a mobile computer. Besides full management software, there are more than a few software development kits on the market that allow the developer to easily produce custom mobile interfaces and that handle the connect to the database. One such software is RFgen another is PeopleVox. Then there is always the option of developing a custom software solution, using a language such as C++, C#, Java, Visual Basic.NET, and many others. Often developing a custom interface using software such as RFgen or developing new, personalized software is the most effective method since it allows the individual to have a solution that is fitted to their exact needs.

Typical system

A typical barcode system consist of some infrastructure, either wired or wireless that connects some number of mobile computers, handheld scanners, and printers to one or many databases that store and analyze the data collected by the system. At some level there must be some software to manage the system. The software may be as simple as code that manages the connection between the hardware and the database or as complex as an ERP, MRP, or some other inventory management software.

References

Barcodes
Automatic identification and data capture
Mobile computers